Ighil Bouchene [إغيل بوشن] is a small village in Ouaguenoun, Tizi Ouzou Province, Algeria, literally meaning Wolf's Hill.  Its main inhabitants are local Kabyles.  The population is around 2500. The village elevation is 802 metres above sea level.

Political life

The president of "Le Committé Du Village" is Ali Moh Uyidir Chenane.  This is based on a centuries-long tradition of community, for which kabyles are renowned.

Economy

The main sources of income are:
- Traditional Medicine tourism: we count at least two main Shayks: Shaykh Rabah and La Ouiza. Due to stiff competition from La Ouiza, Shaykh Rabah has had to relocate to nearby Miraboux.

Religious life
The main religion is Sunni Islam.  The mosque of the village opened in May 2004, and holds the daily prayers, Friday prayers and other religious festivities. A religious committee oversees the running of this place of worship, gather funds, organise events etc.

Recently, signs of evangelism have started to appear, with the leading figure of Dahmane Neggah, with the opening of a church.  This has now closed due to lack of interest from the locals. Leaders also expressed their concern towards these unfamiliar sightings.

Postal Address
Village Ighil Bouchene
Ath Aissa Mimoune
Tizi Ouzou
CP 15624
Algeria

External links
 La Dépêche de Kabylie newspaper account of Ighil Bouchene (French)
 Ighil Bouchène : Un village sans ressources

Populated places in Tizi Ouzou Province
Kabylie